The Outcast Islands are two small islands, nearly  apart, and a number of surrounding rocks lying  southwest of Bonaparte Point, off the southwest coast of Anvers Island in the Palmer Archipelago of Antarctica. The Outcast Islands were named by the United Kingdom Antarctic Place-names Committee (UK-APC) following a survey in 1955 by the Falkland Islands Dependencies Survey (FIDS). The name arose because of their isolated position which is some distance from the other islands in the vicinity of Arthur Harbor.

See also 
 Composite Antarctic Gazetteer
 List of Antarctic and sub-Antarctic islands
 List of Antarctic islands south of 60° S
 SCAR
 Territorial claims in Antarctica

References

Islands of the Palmer Archipelago